Final standings of the Hungarian League 1989–90 season

Final standings

Results

Relegation play-offs 

|}

Statistical leaders

Top goalscorers

External links
 IFFHS link

Nemzeti Bajnokság I seasons
1989–90 in Hungarian football
Hun